Aframomum angustifolium, known as "wild cardamom" in English, is a species in the ginger family Zingiberaceae that grows in tropical Africa and in Madagascar.

In Madagascar, it is known as longoza, due to its use as a source of energy during long hunting treks (lona "long hours", and hoza "to experience diificulties"). The species name, angustifolium, means "narrow-leaved" in Latin.

It is herbaceous and like other plants of this family, its erect "stems" consist of layered tubular leaf bases. The fruit is a berry containing many seeds surrounded by sugary-sweet and sour edible pulp. The crushed seeds are also used as a peppery spice. The leaves are also used as disposable receptacles for eating rice.

References

Flora of East Tropical Africa
Flora of Madagascar
Fruits originating in Africa
angustifolium